Jorge Humberto Raggi (born 17 February 1938), known as Humberto, is a  Portuguese retired professional footballer who played as a striker.

Football career
Humberto played mostly for Académica de Coimbra during his professional career, starting and ending his nine-year career at the club. He also played for three seasons in Italy, with F.C. Internazionale Milano and Vicenza Calcio.

With the Nerazzurri, Humberto only appeared in two Serie A games, but he scored five goals in their 1961–62 Inter-Cities Fairs Cup campaign, including a hat-trick in the first round tie-breaker play-off game against 1. FC Köln.

Personal life

Jorge Humberto is pediatrician and is living in Macao.

External links
Inter archives 

1938 births
Living people
Portuguese footballers
Association football forwards
Primeira Liga players
Associação Académica de Coimbra – O.A.F. players
Serie A players
Inter Milan players
L.R. Vicenza players
Portuguese expatriate footballers
Expatriate footballers in Italy
Portuguese expatriate sportspeople in Italy
Portuguese football managers
Associação Académica de Coimbra – O.A.F. managers
Portuguese people of Cape Verdean descent